The 1927 Delaware State Hornets football team represented Delaware State University in the 1927 college football season as an independent. Though both Delaware State University and College Football Data Warehouse do not record this season, results for two games have been found. The first was a 13–0 victory over Howard High School of Technology and the second was a 12–26 loss against . Their coach was Naylor.

Schedule

References

Delaware State
Delaware State Hornets football seasons
Delaware State Hornets football